In Greek mythology, Aras was an autochthon who was believed to have built Arantea, the most ancient town in Phliasia, Peloponnese.

Family 
Aras had a son called Aoris, and a daughter called Araethyrea.

Mythology 
Araethyrea was said to have been fond of chase and warlike pursuits; she was also the mother of Phlias by Dionysus. When she died, her brother called the country of Phliasia after her Araethyrea. The monuments of Araethyrea and her brother, consisting of round pillars, were still extant in the time of Pausanias; and before the mysteries of Demeter were commenced at Phlius, the people always invoked Aras and his two children with their faces turned towards their monuments.

Notes

Iliad ii. 571; Strabo. viii. p. 382. Paus. ii. 12. §§ 4–6.

References 

 Homer, The Iliad with an English Translation by A.T. Murray, Ph.D. in two volumes. Cambridge, MA., Harvard University Press; London, William Heinemann, Ltd. 1924. . Online version at the Perseus Digital Library.
 Homer, Homeri Opera in five volumes. Oxford, Oxford University Press. 1920. . Greek text available at the Perseus Digital Library.
 Pausanias, Description of Greece with an English Translation by W.H.S. Jones, Litt.D., and H.A. Ormerod, M.A., in 4 Volumes. Cambridge, MA, Harvard University Press; London, William Heinemann Ltd. 1918. . Online version at the Perseus Digital Library
 Pausanias, Graeciae Descriptio. 3 vols. Leipzig, Teubner. 1903.  Greek text available at the Perseus Digital Library.
 Strabo, The Geography of Strabo. Edition by H.L. Jones. Cambridge, Mass.: Harvard University Press; London: William Heinemann, Ltd. 1924. Online version at the Perseus Digital Library.
 Strabo, Geographica edited by A. Meineke. Leipzig: Teubner. 1877. Greek text available at the Perseus Digital Library.

Autochthons of classical mythology
Characters in Greek mythology
Mythology of Argolis